is the fourth anime television series in the Digimon franchise, produced by Toei Animation. Unlike the previous series, the main characters can merge with ancient spirits known as the "Legendary Warriors" to become Digimon themselves.

The series aired in Japan from April 2002 to March 2003. An English-language version, produced by Sensation Animation, was broadcast in North America from September 2002 to July 2003 as the fourth and final season of  Digimon: Digital Monsters.

Synopsis

Setting
In the events prior to the series, ten Digimon creatures from the "Digital World", a parallel universe originated from Earth's various communication networks, sacrificed themselves to seal Lucemon. These Digimon, collectively known as "Legendary Warriors", created artifacts from their data: the twenty "Spirits" (ten Human and Beast Spirits for the elements of fire, light, wind, ice, thunder, earth, wood, water, metal and darkness), before leaving the Digital World in the care of three Celestial Digimon, Ophanimon, Cherubimon and Seraphimon. When Cherubimon betrays them, Ophanimon summons six children from the human world into the Digital World to become the "DigiDestined".

Plot
Takuya, Koji, Zoe, J.P., and Tommy are among several children who receive a text message inviting them board a train at Shibuya Station. The train brings them to the Digital World. While exploring, the five gain the ability of Spirit Evolution, where they are able to transform into ancient Digimon warriors. In addition, their cell phones have turned into a type of Digivice (digital device) known as a D-Tector, which they can also purify defeated Digimon by scanning them.

While exploring, the Legendary Warriors learn from Seraphimon that he, Ophanimon, and Cherubimon once maintained order among the human and beast-type Digimon, until Cherubimon became corrupted and urged the rest of the beast-type Digimon to engage with the human-type Digimon in a war. During this time, the Legendary Warriors are forced to fight five other ancient Digimon warriors, one of which Koji learns is his estranged twin brother, Koichi. Koji manages to purify Koichi, allowing him to join them. They rescue Ophanimon. However, she sacrifices herself to save them. Ophanimon upgrades Takuya and Koji's D-Tectors, with the last of her strength to allow them to Unity Spirit Evolve. After defeating Cherubimon, the DigiDestined learn that Lucemon is sealed within the Digital World's core. Two Royal Knights, Dynasmon and Crusadermon, steal all of the world's data to awaken Lucemon. Takuya and Koji defeat the knights, just as they scan the Digital World. When Lucemon frees himself, he opens a portal to the real world. When Koichi sacrifices his power, Lucemon leaves the Digital World. While all spirits combine to form into the ultimate Legendary Warrior Digimon Susanoomon, Lucemon arrives at the real world. After reviving Ophanimon, Cherubimon and Seraphimon, Susanoomon destroys Lucemon, restoring the data and the Digital World. The children return to the real world and realize that an hour did not pass. They save Koichi by using the power of D-Tectors, before they revert into cell phones. Takuya and his friends embrace their future.

Characters

The leader of the group. He uses the Human Spirit of Fire to become , the Beast Spirit of Fire to become  and the Hybrid Spirit of Fire to become . The combined spirits allow him to transform him into . Takuya also appeared in the third and final season of Digimon Fusion.

 A loner and one of Takuya's friends. He uses the Human Spirit of Light to become , the Beast Spirit of Light to become  and the Hybrid Spirit of Light to become . The combined spirits allow him to transform him into .

The only female member. She uses the Human Spirit of Wind to become , and the Beast Spirit of Wind to become .

The oldest of the group. He uses the Human Spirit of Thunder to become , and the Beast Spirit of Thunder to become .

The youngest of the group. He uses the Human Spirit of Ice to become , and the Beast Spirit of Ice to become .

Koji's twin brother, whose existence was kept from one another after their parents' divorce. After arriving at the Digital World, he is manipulated by Cherubimon. He uses a Human Spirit to transform into , and a Beast Spirit to transform into . Once Koichi reforms, he uses the Human Spirit of Darkness to become , and the Beast Spirit of Darkness to become .

A Celestial Digimon alongside Seraphimon and Orphanimon. He was corrupted by Lucemon. The Digidestined are called to the Digital World to stop Cherubimon and restore peace to the land. In a final battle with the Digidestined, Takuya Kanbara as EmperorGreymon defeats Cherubimon. He is later reborn as Lopmon near the end of the series. In the final episode, the redeemed Cherubimon helps the Digidestined destroy Lucemon.

A prideful, evil fallen angel Digimon and the main antagonist of the series. Lucemon was once a benevolent ruler who brought peace to the Digital World, but became corrupted by his own power and turned into a tyrant. The Ten Ancient Warriors came together to defeat Lucemon and locked him away in the core of the Digital World. Lucemon was able to corrupt Cherubimon and used him to gather the data of the Digital World so that he could be released. Revealed as the true antagonist after Cherubimon's defeat, Lucemon released the Royal Knights to finish his work. Upon his release, Lucemon proved to be more than a match for the Digidestined until Takuya and Koji formed Susanoomon and apparently destroyed Lucemon. However, Lucemon rose again, but as a being of pure evil as Susanoomon only succeeded in scanning his good data. With the encouragement of their friends, the Digidestined formed together into Susanoomon who destroyed Lucemon Shadowlord Mode. However, Lucemon Larva, which contained Lucemon's consciousness, survived and attempted a sneak attack. The spirits of the Ten Legendary Warriors emerged from Susanoomon to destroy Lucemon once and for all with the core sword of Susanoomon's cannon. Lucemon has no form of a DigiEgg.

Production

Toei Animation announced the production of a fourth Digimon series in February 2002 and was set to start in April, after Tamers. Digimon Frontier was conceived by Fuji TV's Go Haruna, Yomiko Advertising's Kyōtarō Kimura, and Hiromi Seki. The series was directed by Yukio Kaizawa, who had previously worked on some Bikkuriman shows and certain One Piece episodes. It was chiefly written by Sukehiro Tomita, while character designs were done by Katsuyoshi Nakatsuru.

Digimon Frontier aired in Japan on Fuji TV from April 7, 2002 to March 30, 2003. The show's opening theme song is "Fire!!" by Kōji Wada, which peaked at #75 on the Oricon Weekly Singles Chart. The insert songs featured in the show are "With the Will" by Kōji Wada, which served as the Spirit Evolution theme, and "The Last Element" by Ayumi Miyazaki, which was the theme song for Unified Spirit Evolution.

An English-language version, produced by Sensation Animation and recorded by Studiopolis, aired in North America as the final season of Digimon: Digital Monsters. It aired on UPN's Disney's One Too block and Canada's YTV between September 9, 2002 and July 14, 2003. Frontier was part of a package deal with Digimon Tamers from when Disney had acquired the rights from Saban Entertainment. UPN aired the show until late August 2003, when they severed their ties to Disney. As with previous "seasons", the English version of Frontier featured an original soundtrack and sound effects, character name changes, and content edits pertaining to scenes deemed too inappropriate for young audiences. The theme song of the English version was produced by Chris Horvath. In addition to the theme song, the show also featured music by Deddy Tzur and Inon Zur.

Media

Home releases
New Video Group released a complete DVD box set of the English-language version on September 10, 2013 in the US, and a DVD collection of the complete English run of Digimon: Digital Monsters, bundling Frontier with the previous three anime series, on October 22, 2013. Manga Entertainment released the series in the United Kingdom on October 29, 2018.

Film
A film companion, Digimon Frontier: Island of Lost Digimon was produced with the same writer, composer and character designer from the TV show, but was directed by Takahiro Imamura. The film premiered at Toei's Summer Anime Fair on July 20, 2002 along with three other productions. Although the fair was deemed a box office failure, earning 800 million yen (US$6.8m)—whereas last edition earned 2 billion yen—, the film alone grossed half of it, 460 million yen. The film aired on Jetix in the United States on November 27, 2005, and reruns were broadcast on Toon Disney in 2007.

Drama CD
A drama CD  titled  was released on April 23, 2003 and is centered on each of the Legendary Warriors sending messages to each other. The cast from the television series reprised their roles.

References

External links
Toei's Digimon Frontier website (Japanese)

2002 anime films
2002 anime television series debuts
Adventure anime and manga
Animated television series about children
Anime and manga about parallel universes
Frontier
Disney's One Too
Fantasy anime and manga
Fuji TV original programming
Japanese children's animated adventure television series
Japanese children's animated science fantasy television series
Japanese animated films
Television series about parallel universes
Television series about shapeshifting
Toei Animation television